Lucerapex carola is a species of sea snail, a marine gastropod mollusk in the family Turridae, the turrids.

Description

Distribution
This species occurs in the Indian Ocean off Somalia

References

 Thiele J. (1925). Gastropoden der Deutschen Tiefsee-Expedition. II Teil. Wissenschaftliche Ergebnisse der Deutschen Tiefsee-Expedition auf dem Dampfer "Valdivia" 1898-1899. 17(2): 35-382, pls 13-46

External links
 Biolib.cz: Lucerapex carola

carola
Gastropods described in 1925